Bo Eriksson (30 March 1922 – 15 December 1982) was a Swedish fencer. He competed at the 1948 and 1952 Summer Olympics in five sabre and foil events in total, but never reached a final. He was the Swedish flag bearer at the 1952 Games.

References

External links
 

1922 births
1982 deaths
Sportspeople from Uppsala
Swedish male foil fencers
Swedish male sabre fencers
Olympic fencers of Sweden
Fencers at the 1948 Summer Olympics
Fencers at the 1952 Summer Olympics